Ashmont, known originally as "J.J. Salmon's Estate" is a south-western suburb of Wagga Wagga, New South Wales, Australia. The suburb is named after the Salmon family's original homestead that was located where the suburb now stands.

Ashmont was first urbanised in the late 1950s, and during the 1970s large areas were developed by the then State Housing Commission (now known as Housing NSW). As of 2019, 21% of dwellings in Ashmont are owned by a federal or state housing authority. The suburb has a high rate of social disadvantage and crime, with crime rates significantly higher compared to state-wide averages.

A small shopping centre, the New South Wales State Emergency Service Murrumbidgee Region and New South Wales Rural Fire Service Riverina Zone Headquarters are located within the suburb.

The Carmelite Monastery, a community of monastic, contemplative nuns, is situated on Morsehead Street.

Demographics
At the 2016 census, the median age in Ashmont is 33, younger than the national average of 38. Aboriginal and/or Torres Strait Islander people constitute 18.0% of the population, significantly higher than the national average of 2.8%.

85.1% of residents were born in Australia, substantially higher than the national average of 66.7%. The most common responses for religion were Catholic 28.4%, No Religion 24.5%, Anglican 21.8%, and Presbyterian and Reformed 4.4%. 9.7% of respondents did not answer the question. Christianity was the largest religious group reported overall, at 71.1% (excluding not stated responses).

12.8% of residents reported being unemployed, nearly double the national average. Median incomes in the suburb were notably lower than average. The median weekly personal income reported was $505, compared to $662 nationally. The median weekly household income was $876, compared to $1,438 nationally. A plurality of families with children, 27.3% had neither parent working.

References

External links 

Suburbs of Wagga Wagga